Farnworth was a county constituency in Lancashire which returned one Member of Parliament (MP) to the House of Commons of the Parliament of the United Kingdom from 1918 until it was abolished for the 1983 general election.

Boundaries 

From 1885 to 1918 the Farnworth area had been included in the Radcliffe-cum-Farnworth constituency.

The Farnworth constituency included Farnworth, Moses Gate, Kearsley, Stoneclough, Little Lever, Little Hulton, Walkden, and Roe Green.

The constituency disappeared in the 1983 redistribution; Farnworth itself and the surrounding wards within the Metropolitan Borough of Bolton were placed in the new Bolton South East constituency where it has remained since, while Walkden, Worsley and surroundings in the City of Salford became part of the new Worsley (1983-2010), later Worsley and Eccles South (2010-present) constituency.

Members of Parliament

Election results

Elections in the 1910s

Elections in the 1920s

Elections in the 1930s

Elections in the 1940s

Elections in the 1950s

Elections in the 1960s

Elections in the 1970s

References

External links

Parliamentary constituencies in North West England (historic)
Constituencies of the Parliament of the United Kingdom established in 1918
Constituencies of the Parliament of the United Kingdom disestablished in 1983
Politics of the Metropolitan Borough of Bolton
Farnworth